Airo may refer to:

Airó, a Portuguese parish
El Airo, Loja, Ecuador, a village
Airo Aviation, an aircraft manufacturer headquartered in the United Arab Emirates
Italian Operations Research Society (Associazione Italiana di Ricerca Operativa)
AIRO, post-nominal letters for an Associate Member of the Institution of Railway Operators (changed to ACIRO in October 2021)
Aksel Airo (1898-1985), Finnish lieutenant general
Airo (more commonly Aiho), 16th century ruler of the Ondo Kingdom in what is now Nigeria
Airo, a character in the Japanese/Korean anime series Zoobles!